National road 53 is a route belonging to the Polish national road network. This route connects Olsztyn with Ostrołęka. The winding section between Olsztyn and Szczytno is the most difficult for drivers.

Route description
National road 53 has GP-class parameters on the Olsztyn - Szczytno - Rozogi section, and G-class parameters on the Rozogi - Myszyniec - Ostrołęka section.

History
National road 53 received its current number on 14 February 1986. The earlier designation is unknown; on the then maps and road atlases, the artery was marked as the so-called a secondary road, without giving its number.

Major cities and towns along the route 
 Olsztyn (national road 16, national road 51)
 Klewki
 Pasym
 Szczytno (national road 57, national road 58)
 Rozogi (national road 59)
 Dąbrowy
 Myszyniec
 Wydmusy
 Kadzidło
 Dylewo
 Ostrołęka (national road 61)

Axle load limit 
National road 53 has an axle limit restrictions.

The allowed axle limit is up to 11.5 tons, which is a standard limit on Polish national roads.

References 

53